The following is a list of people executed by the U.S. state of Louisiana since capital punishment was resumed in 1976.

A total of 28 people convicted of murder have been executed by the state of Louisiana since 1976. Of the 28 people executed, 20 were executed via electrocution and 8 via lethal injection. The most recent Louisiana inmate to be put to death, Gerald Bordelon, waived his appeals and asked the state to carry out his sentence.

See also 
 Capital punishment in Louisiana
 Capital punishment in the United States

Notes

References 

 
Louisiana
Executed